Sports, Sin and Subversion is the new book from Belizean author Evan X Hyde, published in July 2008. It is Hyde's first new work in over three decades (his previous release, X-Communication, was a reprise of his 1970's publishings.)

Plot 
Hyde takes as his point of departure his childhood in the downtown area of Belize City, discussing in effect the history of Belizean sports and sports personalities as he saw it from the late 1950s through to the present day.

Hyde makes many references to famous sportspeople in Belize, as well as famous internationals who interacted with Belize and Belizeans: Willie Mays, Roberto Clemente, Muhammad Ali, as well as popular sports teams: San Francisco Giants, New York Yankees, Philadelphia 76ers and Chicago Cubs.

2008 non-fiction books
Sports autobiographies
Books about sports
Sport in Belize
Belizean books